German submarine U-611 was a Type VIIC U-boat built for Nazi Germany's Kriegsmarine for service during World War II.
She was laid down on 22 April 1941 by Blohm & Voss, Hamburg as yard number 587, launched on 8 January 1942 and commissioned on 26 February 1942 under Kapitänleutnant Nikolaus von Jacobs.

Service history
The boat's career began with training at 5th U-boat Flotilla on 26 February 1942, followed by active service on 1 October 1942 as part of the 3rd Flotilla for the remainder of her service. In one patrol she sank no ships.

Design
German Type VIIC submarines were preceded by the shorter Type VIIB submarines. U-611 had a displacement of  when at the surface and  while submerged. She had two shafts and two  propellers.

U-611 was fitted with five  torpedo tubes (four fitted at the bow and one at the stern), fourteen torpedoes, one  SK C/35 naval gun, 220 rounds, and a  C/30 anti-aircraft gun. The boat had a complement of between forty-four and sixty.

Wolfpacks
U-611 took part in three wolfpacks, namely:
 Kreuzotter (17 – 22 November 1942)
 Drachen (22 November – 3 December 1942)
 Panzer (3 – 8 December 1942)

Fate
U-611 was sunk on 8 December 1942 in the North Atlantic SE of Cape Farewell, Greenland, in position , by depth charges from a RAF Liberator bomber of 120 Squadron. All hands were lost.

References

Bibliography

External links

German Type VIIC submarines
1942 ships
U-boats commissioned in 1942
Ships lost with all hands
U-boats sunk in 1942
U-boats sunk by depth charges
U-boats sunk by British aircraft
World War II shipwrecks in the Atlantic Ocean
World War II submarines of Germany
Ships built in Hamburg
Maritime incidents in December 1942